Rugby union at the Mediterranean Games has been played four times from 1955 to 1993.

Men's tournaments

 A round-robin tournament determined the final standings.

Medal table

External links 
 Mediterranean Games - Rugby union

 
R
Mediterranean Games